Vithanage is a surname. Notable people with the surname include:

Navindu Vithanage (born 1998), Sri Lankan cricketer
Prasanna Vithanage (born 1962), Sri Lankan film director
Samantha Vithanage (died 2002), Sri Lankan activist
Vijayani Vithanage (born 1975), Sri Lankan-born Canadian cricketer